Abraham (died 1080) was Bishop of St David's and the Cathedral Close in Pembrokeshire, Wales from 1078, when he succeeded Sulien, until his murder in 1078 or 1080, during a Viking invasion. Sulien then served again as bishop.

His two sons, Isaac and Hedd, are commemorated on a c. early-twelfth-century stone cross discovered in 1891 in St David's Cathedral. The Abraham Stone now resides in the Tower Gate House and Bell Tower of the original cathedral city.

Notes

References

Welsh religious leaders
Bishops of St Davids
1080 deaths